Bob Brooker (17 October 1926 – 11 October 1986) was an Australian rules footballer who played for North Melbourne in the Victorian Football League (VFL).

References

External links

North Melbourne Football Club players
Syd Barker Medal winners
Australian rules footballers from Victoria (Australia)
1926 births
1986 deaths
Place of birth missing